The Nevadan is a 1950 American Western film directed by Gordon Douglas and starring Randolph Scott, Dorothy Malone, Forrest Tucker, Frank Faylen, and George Macready. Written by George W. George and George F. Slavin, the film is about a mysterious stranger who crosses paths with an outlaw bank robber and a greedy rancher. The Nevadan was filmed in Lone Pine, California.

Plot
United States Marshal Andrew Barclay arranges the escape of outlaw Tom Tanner in order to locate the $250,000 in gold stolen by Tanner in a stagecoach robbery. Tanner notices he's being followed by Barclay, whose appearance suggests he is a greenhorn. Tanner ambushes Barclay and forces him to trade clothes and accompany him to a bank, where Tanner retrieves an envelope containing a map from a safe deposit box showing the location of the stolen gold.

On the road, Tanner and Barclay are stopped by two brothers, Jeff and Bart, who pull their guns and demand the map. To Tanner's surprise, Barclay disarms the brothers and takes their horses. Later he explains that he is a fugitive just like Tanner and proposes that they work together as a team. That night, while Barclay is asleep, Tanner rides on without him.

The next day, Barclay stops at a ranch owned by beautiful Karen Galt and trades his lame horse for a fresh one. He continues on to the nearby town of Twin Forks, which is run by Karen's father, Edward Galt. At the local saloon, Barclay sees Tanner who pretends not to know him. Galt watches their exchange and later questions Barclay about Tanner's stolen gold, which was never discovered following the robbery. When Barclay denies knowing Tanner, Galt orders his henchmen to beat him up.

Later that night, Tanner kills an intruder in his room. In an effort to force Tanner to reveal the location of the gold, Galt sets him up, making it look like cold-blooded murder rather than self defense. After being taken to jail, Tanner escapes with the help of Barclay after agreeing to share the gold. The two men ride out to the old Galt ranch, now used as a pasture for sick horses. When Karen discovers them hiding there, Barclay takes her aside and reveals that he is in fact a U.S. Marshal.

Meanwhile, Galt recognizes the escape horses used by Tanner and Barclay as belonging to his ranch. Later he questions his daughter about them, and she reveals Barclay's secret, unaware that her father is after the gold himself. When Karen overhears Galt plotting with his henchmen, however, she realizes that Barclay's life is in danger and rides to the hideout to warn him. One of Galt's men follows her, however, and summons the others to the old Galt ranch. When they arrive, Karen meets them with gunfire, which gives Barclay and Tanner a head start on their escape.

Galt catches up with his daughter and has her put in custody while he and the others track Barclay and Tanner to an old mine shaft where Tanner has hidden the stolen gold. During the ensuing gunfight, Galt and his men are killed. Barclay reveals that Tanner was allowed to escape so that the gold could be retrieved. When the mine shaft caves in, Barclay overcomes Tanner and takes his prisoner back to jail. Karen knows he will return to her because he has left his horse in her care.

Cast
 Randolph Scott as Andrew Barclay
 Dorothy Malone as Karen Galt
 Forrest Tucker as Tom Tanner
 Frank Faylen as Jeff
 George Macready as Edward Galt
 Charles Kemper as Sheriff Dyke Merrick
 Jeff Corey as Bart
 Tom Powers as Bill Martin
 Jock Mahoney as Sandy
 Olin Howland as Rusty (uncredited)

Production

Filming locations
 Alabama Hills, Lone Pine, California, USA 
 Columbia/Warner Bros. Ranch, 411 North Hollywood Way, Burbank, California, USA 
 Hidden Valley, Thousand Oaks, California, USA 
 Hoppy Cabin, Alabama Hills, Lone Pine, California, USA 
 Iverson Ranch, 1 Iverson Lane, Chatsworth, Los Angeles, California, USA

References

External links
 
 
 
 
 

1950 films
1950 Western (genre) films
American Western (genre) films
Films directed by Gordon Douglas
Films shot in Lone Pine, California
Cinecolor films
Columbia Pictures films
1950s English-language films
1950s American films